Primal Rock Therapy is an EP by Seattle grunge band Blood Circus, released in 1989 by Sub Pop. It was reissued on CD in 1992 with seven additional 1989 tracks: the band's first non-album single and five unreleased tracks. It was produced by grunge producer and Skin Yard guitarist Jack Endino. Music photographer Charles Peterson shot the cover image.

Although Blood Circus were one of the original bands on the grunge scene in the late 1980s, and Primal Rock Therapy has since been recognized for its historic status as one of the first grunge albums ever released, at the time of the album's release it was panned by critics and became one of the poorest-selling albums ever released on Sub Pop.

Track listing

Original release
1. "Road to Hell"2. "Part of the Crowd"3. "My Dad's Dead"4. "Lime Green"5. "Gnarly"

Reissue
"Two Way Street" - 2:53
"Six Foot Under" - 3:52
"My Dad's Dead" - 2:27
"Lime Green" - 3:00
"Gnarly" - 3:26
"Road to Hell" - 5:10
"Part of the Crowd" - 3:17
"White Dress" - 1:53
"Green Room" - 2:10
"Electric Johnny" - 4:34
"Sea Chanty" - 4:42
"Bloodman" - 3:16

References

External links
Official Blood Circus website

1992 albums
Blood Circus (band) albums
Sub Pop albums